Jennifer Sowle (born September 11, 1977) is a classically trained coloratura soprano. Sowle currently resides in Dallas, Texas, USA.  She has a Bachelor of Arts in Vocal Performance from Auburn University and a Master of Music degree from the University of North Texas.  In 2008 she was the featured vocalist in a rock opera by Timo Tolkki, Saana – Warrior of Light Pt 1, which was released on March 14, 2008.

Biography

At Auburn University, Sowle was a member of AU Singers, the Women’s Chorus, and the Concert Choir. She sometimes accompanied the different groups with her flute. She actively participated in the university’s “Evening of Opera” productions each spring of her college career.  She also performed the national anthem at sporting events for Auburn University.  While at Auburn, Sowle played the role of Della in the Auburn Community Theater production of The Gifts of the Magi.  A member of the Golden Key International Honour Society, she graduated cum laude from Auburn University in 2000.

In the summer of 2000, she attended the Peter Harrower Summer Opera Workshop in Atlanta as a recipient of the Johnnie D. Little Scholarship from the Auburn Arts Association.

In 2006, Sowle graduated magna cum laude with a Master of Music degree from the University of North Texas in Denton. While at UNT, she sang operatic roles including Queen of the Night in The Magic Flute, Barbarina in The Marriage of Figaro, the Fairy Godmother in Cendrillon, and Baby Doe in The Ballad of Baby Doe. She also worked as stage manager for UNT’s production of The Magic Flute, Falstaff, Madame Butterfly, and the world premiere of Dorian Gray.

She sang the operatic role First Touriere in Suor Angelica with the Metroplex Opera of Dallas and worked as stage manager on The Impresario for The Living Opera.  Her work in Dallas has also included singing the national anthem for Texas Rangers baseball games and appearing in the Disney film Invincible.

Sowle is also a professional model with experience in print, runway, and commercial modeling.

Discography
Saana – Warrior of Light Pt 1 (2008)

References

1977 births
Living people
Auburn University alumni
University of North Texas College of Music alumni
American operatic sopranos
Women rock singers
21st-century American women singers
21st-century American singers